Alkynols (hydroxyalkynes) are organic chemical compounds derived from alkynes and are among the alcohols. Thus, as structural features, they have a C≡C triple bond and a hydroxy group. They are not identical to the ynols. Some alkynols play a role as intermediates in the chemical industry.

Compounds in this group include propargyl alcohol, 3-butyn-1-ol, and 5-hexyn-1-ol.

Synthesis 
Alkynols may be formed by the alkynylation of carbonyl compounds, usually in liquid ammonia.

Literature 
 Allinger, Cava, de Jongh, Johnson, Lebel, Stevens: Organische Chemie, 1. Auflage, Walter de Gruyter, Berlin 1980, p. 749.
 Beyer / Walter: Lehrbuch der Organischen Chemie, 19. Auflage, S. Hirzel Verlag, Stuttgart 1981, pp. 98–99, 122.
 K. Peter C. Vollhardt, Neil E. Schore: Organische Chemie, 4. Auflage, Wiley-VCH, Weinheim 2005, p. 632.

References